"Oh Baby!" is a song by the Dutch group Twenty 4 Seven. It was released as the first single from their third album, I Wanna Show You. The video was shot in London, and filmed by director Steve Walker. A midtempo ballad, "Oh Baby" did not have the same impact on the charts as the group's previous singles, although it did reach the top 40 charts in several European countries.

Charts

Weekly charts

Year-end charts

References

1994 singles
1994 songs
Twenty 4 Seven songs
1990s ballads
Pop ballads
CNR Music singles
ZYX Music singles